Poisson-type random measures are a family of three random counting measures which are closed under restriction to a subspace, i.e. closed under thinning. They are the only distributions in the canonical non-negative power series family of distributions to possess this property and include the Poisson distribution, negative binomial distribution, and binomial distribution. The PT family of distributions is also known as the Katz family of distributions, the Panjer or (a,b,0) class of distributions and may be retrieved through the Conway–Maxwell–Poisson distribution.

Throwing stones 
Let  be a non-negative integer-valued random variable ) with law , mean  and when it exists variance . Let  be a probability measure on the measurable space .

The random counting measure  on  depends on the pair of deterministic probability measures  through the stone throwing construction (STC) 

where  has law  and iid  have law .  is a mixed binomial process

Let  be the collection of positive -measurable functions.

The mean and variance are given by

and

The covariance for arbitrary  is given by

When  is Poisson, negative binomial, or binomial, it is said to be Poisson-type (PT).

 

Theorem: Marked STC 
Consider random measure  and the transition probability kernel  from  into .

The following corollary is an immediate consequence.

Corollary: Restricted STC 
Moreover, for any , we have that  where .

Note  where we use .

Collecting Bones 
The probability law of the random measure is determined by its Laplace functional and hence generating function.

Definition: Bone 
When  and  share the same family of laws subject to a rescaling  of the parameter , then  is a called a bone distribution. The bone condition for the pgf is given by
.

Equipped with the notion of a bone distribution and condition, the main result for the existence and uniqueness of Poisson-type (PT) random counting measures is given as follows.

Theorem: existence and uniqueness of PT random measures 

Consider the random measure  on the space  and assume that  is diffuse.

iff  is Poisson, negative binomial, or binomial (Poisson-type).

The proof for this theorem is based on a generalized additive Cauchy equation and its solutions. The PT random measures are the Poisson random measure, negative  binomial random measure, and binomial random measure. Poisson is additive with independence on disjoint sets, whereas negative binomial has positive covariance and binomial has negative covariance. The binomial process is a limiting case of binomial random measure where .

Distributional self-similarity applications

These ideas appear closely connected to those of self-decomposability and stability of discrete random variables. Binomial thinning is a foundational model to count time-series. The Poisson random measure has the well-known splitting property, is prototypical to the class of additive (completely random) random measures, and is related to the structure of Levy processes, the jumps of Kolmogorov equations (Markov jump process), and the excursions of Brownian motion. Hence the self-similarity property of the PT family is fundamental to multiple areas. The PT family members are "primitives" or prototypical random measures by which many random measures and processes can be constructed.

References

Poisson distribution